Galwegian Gaelic (also known as Gallovidian Gaelic, Gallowegian Gaelic, or Galloway Gaelic) is an extinct dialect of Scottish Gaelic formerly spoken in southwest Scotland. It was spoken by the people of Galloway and Carrick until the early modern period. Little (except numerous placenames) has survived of the dialect, so that its exact relationship with other Gaelic language is uncertain.

History and extent

Gaelicisation in Galloway and Carrick occurred at the expense of Old English and Cumbric, a British dialect. Old Irish can be traced in the Rhins of Galloway from at least the fifth century. How it developed and spread is largely unknown. The Gaelicisation of the land was complete probably by the eleventh century, although some have suggested a date as early as the beginning of the ninth century. The main problem is that this folk-movement is unrecorded in historical sources, so it has to be reconstructed from things such as place-names. According to the placename studies of W. F. H. Nicolaisen, formerly of the University of Edinburgh, the earliest layer is represented by compound placenames starting with Sliabh "mountain" (often Anglicised Slew- or Sla(e-) and Carraig "rock" (Anglicised as Carrick). This would make the settlement roughly contemporary with what was then Dál Riata. The Gall-Gaidhel (the Norse Gaels or "foreign Gaels"), who gave their name to the area, appear to have settled in the ninth and tenth centuries. Many of the leading settlers would have been of both Norse and Gaelic heritage, and it was the Gaelicisation of these Norse leaders which distinguished them from other Norse lords of northern Britain such as those in Shetland, Orkney and Caithness.

It is quite possible that even as late as the twelfth century, Cumbric (a Brythonic language related to Welsh) was still spoken in Annandale and lower Strathnith (where a man called Gille Cuithbrecht has the Gaelic nickname Bretnach [=Welshman]), but these areas seem to have been thoroughly Gaelicised by the end of that century. A couple of legal terms also survive in medieval documents. The demise of Cumbric in the region is even harder to date than that of Gaelic.

The likely eastern limit reached by the language was the River Annan, for the reason that Gaelic placenames disappear quite rapidly beyond this boundary. In the north it was possibly cut off from other Scottish dialects in the 14th, if not the 13th century.

Culture

Gaelic-speakers in medieval Galloway, whom Richard of Hexham erroneously called Picts, had a fearsome reputation. They were the barbarians par excellence of the northern English Chroniclers, said, amongst other things, to have ripped babies out of their mothers' wombs. It was reported that by Walter of Guisborough in 1296, that during a raid on Hexham Priory, the Galwegians under William Wallace desecrated the shrine of St Andrew, cut off the head of the saint's statue, and threw relics into a fire.

Although Galloway was peripheral to Scotland until 1234, in the aftermath of the rebellion of Gille Ruadh and the dissolution of the Lordship, Galloway and Galwegians became critical. In many ways, the Scottish Wars of independence were just a Galwegian civil war, with the Bruces the successors of Gilla Brigte mac Fergusa and the Balliols the successors of Uchtred mac Fergusa.

Under the post-1234 Franco-Gaelic lordship were several powerful kin-groups, or clans, for instance, the MacLellans, the MacDowalls, and the Kennedys of Carrick. It was probably through these groups that Galwegian society operated for the remainder of the Middle Ages. Evidence for a clan system in the area can be found in medieval records – cineal (kindred) appears in such terms as "kenelman", and "kenkynol" (Ceann-cinneil); muinntir (household) appears in "Muntercasduff"; clan in "Clenafren", "Clanmacgowin" et al. A number of local surnames have Gaelic origins e.g. Landsburgh (originally McClambroch), MacClumpha, MacGuffock, Hannay, McKie, McNay, Kennedy, and MacCulloch. The placenames Balmaclellan and Balmaghie may represent the site of chiefs' residences.

Evidence of a bardic class can be found in such placenames as Dervaird (Doire a' Bhaird) and Loch Recar (Loch an Reacaire).

Important information about local agriculture can be gleaned from placenames as well: shielings (àiridh) were in use e.g. Airies, Airieholland; manured infield from Talnotrie (talamh an otraigh) and Auchnotteroch. Gall-ghàidhil agriculture is indicated in the use of peighinn and its subdivisions (q.v.), e.g. Pinminnoch, Leffin Donald, Fardin; Daugh and quarterland (ceathramh) also appear, e.g. Doach, Kirriedarroch, Terraughty.

Relationships to other languages

It is thought that Galwegian Gaelic probably had more in common with the Manx and Ulster Irish than with Scottish Gaelic as spoken in the Highlands. However, medieval Goidelic was a single language, spoken from Munster to Sutherland, with a universal educated standard and many regional dialects, which might have been mutually comprehensible. It is possible that the Gaelic dialect of the Isle of Arran parallels the Galwegian language most, but this is purely speculative.

Galwegian Gaelic may have borrowed certain words from Old English or Norse. The influence of the Anglian Bishopric of Whithorn, with the Norse Gall-Gaidhel, could explain the word cirice (O.E.)/ kirkja (O.N.) (=Church): see kirk is used in so many placenames with Celtic second-elements and word order. Cirice/ kirkja occurs in medieval placenames where, in the rest of Scotland, one would expect Cille. Examples are legion. They include Kirkcormac, Kirkmikbrick, Kirkinner, Kirkcolm, Kirkcowan, Kirkmabrick. In these names, the first word is Germanic and the second Gaelic. The word order is typical of the Celtic languages, with the adjective following the noun, rather than the Germanic adjective preceding the noun (c/f Dùn Èideann and Edin-burgh). It is possible that this was a feature of the dialect, but it is also possible that most of these are the product of later English semi-translations.

Early English influence would not be surprising given the popularity of English saints. Kirkcudbright, for example, means Church of St Cuthbert. Closeburn, earlier Killeosberne (Cille (Gd. Church) + of Osbern) is another. A plethora of personal names confirm the popularity of Anglo-Saxon culture. For example, the name Gille Cuithbrecht (= Manx, Giolla Cobraght) means devotee of St Cuthbert. Another historical example is Gille Aldan, the name of the first bishop of Galloway after the resurrection of that see by King Fergus.

1500 and after
An important source for the perception of Galwegian language is the poem known as The Flyting of Dunbar and Kennedy. The poem, written somewhere between 1504 and 1508, portrays an ideological, historical and cultural conflict between William Dunbar (representing Lothian, and Anglic Scotland) and Walter Kennedy (representing Carrick and Gaelic Scotland). Dunbar ridicules Kennedy's Heland ("Highland") accent and Erische ("Irish") language, whilst Kennedy defends it, saying calling it "all trew Scottismennis leid" and telling Dunbar "in Ingland sowld be thy habitation." The salient point is that, from a Lothian perspective, as late as the early sixteenth century, Carrick and Galloway still represented Gaelic Scotland, just as Lothian did Anglian Scotland. Kennedy is referred to as "Heland". Although Kennedy's surviving works are written in Middle Scots he may also have composed in Scottish Gaelic. In the Flyting, for instance, Dunbar makes big play of Kennedy's Carrick roots (albeit in the rankly insulting terms that are part of the genre) and strongly associates him with Erschry, "Irishry" which meant in other words the bardic tradition; the term Irish in Scotland signified Gaelic generally:

{{poemquote|Sic eloquence as thay in Erschry use,
In sic is sett thy thraward appetyte.
Thow hes full littill feill of fair indyte.
I tak on me, ane pair of Lowthiane hippis
Sall fairar Inglis mak and mair perfyte
Than thow can blabbar with thy Carrik lippis.

Such eloquence as they in Irishry [Gaeldom] useIs what defines your perverse taste.
You have very small aptitude for good verse-making.I'll wager, a pair of Lothian hips
Shall fairer English make and more polishedThan you can blabber with your Carrick lips.}}

Alexander Montgomerie (1545? – 1610?) was also a Gaelic speaker, and was termed the "Hielant Captain"; various Gaelic terms and phrases can be found in his works.

George Buchanan, himself a Gaelic speaker, writing in 1575, reported that Gaelic was still spoken in Galloway. In the middle of the century, 1563–1566, an anonymous English military investigator reported that the people of Carrick "for the most part specke erishe".

After this, there is much ambiguous and indirect evidence that the language was spoken, if only fragmentedly, into the eighteenth century. Margaret McMurray (died 1760) is one of the last speakers we know of by name, although there are some suggestions that linguist Alexander Murray (1775–1813) may have learnt it from his aged father, a local upland shepherd.

It is safe to say, though, that the Galwegian language died out somewhere between 1700 and 1800. It is notable though, that nearby areas such as the Isle of Man, east Ulster (especially Rathlin Island and the Glens of Antrim), and Arran all had native Gaelic speakers into the 20th century.

Example
Virtually no known records of Galwegian Gaelic exist. The only known text is a Galwegian song collected from a North Uist shennachie called Òran Bagraidh which was collected by the oral historian Donald MacRury from his schoolmaster. Although the song is broadly comprehensible, it contains many obscure words, shown in bold.

The song contains numerous examples of linguistic features associated with known Southern dialects (such as unlenited tu "you" and dom "to me" (usually thu and dhomh). The retention of the verbal particle in the last stanza do bhi is also highly unusual for a Scottish Gaelic dialect, as is the form inn san "in the" (usually anns an). The negative nì (usually chan) is also a feature more commonly associated with Irish dialects, rather than Scottish Gaelic.

Modern influence
Although Galwegian Gaelic has left no extant literature and has been extinct for over two centuries, the Gaelic heritage of Galloway continued to inspire modern writers, such as the late William Neill, a poet who wrote in Scottish Gaelic and Irish, Lowland Scots, and English. Another example of the modern legacy is the "Gall-Gael Trust" founded by Colin MacLeod.

On 8 September 2018 a one-day conference 'Galloway: Gaelic's Lost Province' was held at the Catstrand in New Galloway.

Notes

References
Alcock, Leslie, Kings & Warriors, Craftsmen & Priests in Northern Britain, AD 550–850, (Edinburgh, 2003)
Brown, Michael, The Black Douglases: War and Lordship in Late Medieval Scotland, 1300–1455, (East Linton, 1999)
Driscoll, Steven, Alba: The Gaelic Kingdom of Scotland, AD 800–1124, (Edinburgh, 2002)
Lorimer, W. L., "The Persistence of Gaelic in Galloway and Carrick", in Scottish Gaelic Studies, VI.2 (1949), pp. 114–36
MacQueen, John, Welsh and Gaelic in Galloway in Transactions of the Dumfries-shire and Galloway Natural History and Antiquarian Society #32 (1953–54)
MacQueen, John, Pennyland and Doach in South Western Scotland: A Preliminary Note in Scottish Studies #23, (1979)
Nicolaisen, W. F. H., Scottish Placenames: Their Study and Significance (London, 1976)
Oram, Richard, The Lordship of Galloway, (Edinburgh, 2000)
Thomas, C., Britain and Ireland in Early Christian Times AD 400–800 (London, 1971)
Thomas, C., The Irish Settlements in post-Roman Western Britain: a Survey of the Evidence in Journal of the Royal Institution of Cornwall #6, (1972)
Watson, W. J., Celtic Placenames of Scotland,'' (Edinburgh, 1926)

External links
Lingua Celticae
Galloway Gaelic and Old Welsh

Carrick, Scotland
Languages of the United Kingdom
Extinct languages of Europe
Medieval languages
Scottish Gaelic dialects
Culture of medieval Scotland
Galloway
Extinct Celtic languages
Extinct languages of Scotland
Dumfriesshire
Languages extinct in the 18th century